K. J. Stevens (born June 4, 1973) is an American novelist and short story writer. His writing has appeared in The Adirondack Review, Fluid Magazine, Me Three, Circle Magazine, Cellar Door, Prose Ax, Temenos, and BloodLotus. Pilgrims Bay, Stevens first novel, was released in 2007. 
    
Stevens' writing style has been described as minimalist. Ernest Hemingway, J.D. Salinger, Gertrude Stein, Amanda Davis, Sylvia Plath, Raymond Carver, David Shaw, and Flannery O'Connor have been attributed as his influences.

Biography
Stevens was born in Alpena, Michigan, but grew up in Maple Ridge Township. Stevens attended Central Michigan University up to December 1999, where he published his first work with fellow Michigan writer Travis Mulhauser, titled Corvallis Road. Afterwards, he studied creative writing at Hamline University in Saint Paul, Minnesota.

He currently resides in Alpena, Michigan.

Bibliography

Novels 
Pilgrims Bay (2007)

Collections
Corvallis Road (with Travis Mulhauser ) (1999)
A Better Place (2002)
Infidelity (2004)
Dead Bunnies (2004)
CUTTING TEETH (2012)

Poetry
Introspection (chapbook) (1999)

Nonfiction
Landscaping (2007)

References

External links
Profile and blog at Amazon.com
"K.J. Stevens blog at Open Salon

Works
"CUTTING TEETH" by K.J. Stevens
"Pilgrim's Bay" by K.J. Stevens
"Dead Bunnies" by K.J. Stevens
Full text of Seven Corners by K.J. Stevens
Full text of In Debt by K.J. Stevens
Full text of The Throw Away by K.J. Stevens
Full text of Dead Bunnies by K.J. Stevens
Poems by K.J. Stevens

1973 births
21st-century American novelists
American bloggers
American male novelists
Central Michigan University alumni
Living people
Novelists from Michigan
Minimalist writers
People from Alpena, Michigan
21st-century American poets
American male poets
American male essayists
American male short story writers
21st-century American short story writers
21st-century American essayists
21st-century American male writers
American male bloggers